Jim Booth (7 February 1945 – 4 January 1994) was a New Zealand film producer and actor, known for producing early films from Peter Jackson, including Meet the Feebles (1989) and Braindead (1992).

Booth died of cancer on 4 January 1994, at the age of 48.

Filmography

References

External links
 

1945 births
1994 deaths
People from Auckland
New Zealand film producers
20th-century New Zealand male actors